The German Society of Surgery is a German medical organization.

It was founded in 1872 and is one of the oldest medical-scientific learned societies. It is headquartered in Berlin and is headed by president Joachim Jähne and secretary-general Hans-Joachim Meyer.

References

Organizations established in 1872
Medical and health organisations based in Berlin
Medical associations based in Germany